Pumilio homolog 1 is a protein that in humans is encoded by the PUM1 gene.

Function 

This gene encodes a member of the PUF family, evolutionarily conserved RNA-binding proteins related to the Pumilio proteins of Drosophila and the fem-3 mRNA binding factor proteins of C. elegans. The encoded protein contains a sequence-specific RNA binding domain composed of eight repeats and N- and C-terminal flanking regions, and serves as a translational regulator of specific mRNAs by binding to their 3' untranslated regions. The evolutionarily conserved function of the encoded protein in invertebrates and lower vertebrates suggests that the human protein may be involved in translational regulation of embryogenesis, and cell development and differentiation. Alternatively spliced transcript variants encoding different isoforms have been described.

References

Further reading